Exaeretia lepidella is a moth of the family Depressariidae. It is found in Russia  (the Urals and Siberia).

References

Moths described in 1872
Exaeretia
Moths of Asia
Moths of Europe